The H. & S. Pogue Company was a Cincinnati, Ohio based department store chain founded by two brothers, Henry and Samuel Pogue.  They came from County Cavan, Northern Ireland, to Cincinnati and worked in their uncle's dry goods store. They later were able to buy him out and H. & S. Pogue Dry Goods Company was established in 1863 at 111 West Fifth Street.  Brothers Thomas, Joseph, and William Pogue would eventually join the enterprise.

Growing with the Queen City 
The original storefront on West Fifth Street led to the Pogue brothers contracting to have their own store built on more fashionable West Fourth Street between Race and Vine Streets directly across from Enin, McAlpin & Company, a location they would maintain throughout the company's history.  The modest 31' storefront grew quickly, soon expanding into the buildings adjacent on each side.  Renowned architect Samuel Hannaford was chosen to design the company's flagship store in 1916, expanding the enterprise westward to the corner of Race Street, the result being a graceful Edwardian structure with an impressive six acres of selling space spread over seven floors.  Publicity drawings were made of a completed store with the three original storefronts demolished and replaced with a never-to-occur expansion of the Hannaford-designed structure. 

The downtown store would be expanded again, despite the Great Depression, in 1930 when an alley was removed to provide a nine-story mechanical and ventilation tower that included ten service and passenger elevators connecting the building's 11 floors of two basements, six above-ground selling floors, and three service/storage levels.  The structure also served to functionally connect the store northward into the arcade of the new Carew Tower, where Pogue's would occupy the southern side, the northern side and five floors above it being occupied by long-time competitor Mabley & Carew.

In 1948, the 12-story, 110,000 square foot, Service Building would be constructed a block south of the store at the corner of Third and Race Streets, housing the growing business's clothing alterations, carpet, drapery, millinery (Pogue's creations regularly come up for sale on eBay), and upholstery workrooms; the print shop; fur storage; engraving and silver polishing; and watch repair. Sensitive to the building's location on a prominent street in the heart of the financial district, the firm selected respected Cincinnati architect Henry Hake to craft a handsome brick tower similar in design to the striking modernist Terrace Plaza Hotel three blocks north of it and completed the same year.  Hake and Son's other notable Cincinnati commissions included the Cincinnati Reds' Crosley Field, the Queen City Club, and the headquarters for the Western and Southern Life Insurance Company.  A three-story warehouse, primarily for furniture and appliances,  was maintained at Sixth and Cutter Streets in an area of the downtown Cincinnati street grid that would vanish with the construction of Interstate 75.

Suburban expansion came in April 1959 with the opening of a 60,000 square foot boutique-style branch at Kenwood Plaza and construction underway of a 160,000 square foot full-scale branch store at Tri-County Center.  As the decade drew to its close, Pogue's was firmly established as the region's finest department store, and second-largest after the John Shillito Company.  However, it was already apparent that the changes reshaping post-war America, with shoppers steadily moving to the suburbs and preferring automobiles rather than public transportation, were leading to the end of the single-location department store in an urban center. Further suburban expansion and a downtown garage were critical to the business's success, and expensive.

The decision was made in 1961 to sell the business to Associated Dry Goods, an affiliation of upscale department stores founded in 1911 by several New York City-area retailers headed by Lord & Taylor.  Other divisions at the time of the Pogue's sale included Hahne & Company (Newark NJ), J.W. Robinson (Los Angeles), The Diamond (Charleston WV), William Hengerer Company (Buffalo), and Sibley, Lindsey & Curr (Rochester).  Locally, Shillito's had been a unit of Federated Department Stores, forerunner of today's Macy's, since the 1930s, and, in 1960, long-time competitor Mabley & Carew had sold out to Allied Stores, then one of the nation's largest department store chains with well-known divisions including Stern Brothers (New York City), Jordan Marsh (Boston) and Miller & Rhoads (Richmond), and, regionally, the William Block Company (Indianapolis), Polsky's (Akron), and The Fashion (Columbus).  Allied also owned the three-location Rollman & Sons stores in Cincinnati at the time of the Mabley & Carew purchase, but would operate the two chains independently for two years before merging them into the Rollman locations but under the Mabley & Carew nameplate.

At the time of the sale to Associated Dry Goods, the H&S Pogue Company employed approximately 1,500 persons (an additional 700 were hired seasonally each Christmas) and the layout of the store was as follows:

Sub-Basement: Delivery Wrapping, Employee Locker Rooms.
 
Basement: Budget Store - Women's Accessories, Clothing, Coats, Hosiery, Lingerie, Millinery, and Sportswear; Infants; Children's Clothing; and Men's Furnishings.

Main Floor: Candy, Clocks, Epicure, Fine Silver, Florist, Hosiery, Gifts, Gloves, Jewelry, Leather Goods, Men's Furnishings, Notions, Service Desk (Information and Cashiers), Stationary, Tobacconist, Toilet Goods (Cosmetics), Umbrellas,  Watches, Women's Budget Blouses and Millinery, Women's Shoes.

2nd Floor: Children's Clothing and Shoes, Domestics, Gift Wrap, Infants/Layette, Laces and Trimmings, Linens, Men's Coats and Suits, Men's Shoes, Men's Restroom, Patterns, Portrait Studio, Ribbons, Yard Goods (Fabrics).

3rd Floor: Bridal Salon, Fashion Office (Special Events, Cincy-Hi and Collegiate Fashion Boards), Fur Salon, Juniors, Lingerie, Maternity Shop, Millinery, Robes, Rose Room Restaurant, Wedding Consultant, Women's Clothing and Sportswear, Women's Restroom.

4th Floor: Art Needlework, Better Homes & Gardens Home Planning Center, Bridal Registry, China and Crystal, Draperies, Glassware, Lamps, Rugs, Toys.

5th Floor: Auditing, Bedding, Books and Rental Library, Furniture, Interior Design Studio, Luggage, Pictures and Mirrors.

6th Floor: Accounting, Adjustments, Appliances, Buying Offices, Cashiers, Check Cashing, Customer Lounge, Executive Offices, Housewares, Jane Alden (Mail and Telephone Order Service), Paints, Records, Travel Bureau, Unfinished Furniture, Will Call, Women's Rest Room.

7th Floor: Advertising, Beauty Salon, Credit Union, Employee Cafeteria, First Aid, Maintenance, Operations, Personnel, Sales Promotions, Security, Staff Training.
 
8th Floor: Receiving and Marking.

9th Floor: Competitive Shoppers, Sign Shop, Visual Merchandising

Associated Dry Goods: Expansion then Decline 
Change came quickly after the sale to Associated Dry Goods in 1962.  The downtown store was expanded that year into the first two floors of the former Mabley & Carew space in the Carew Tower Arcade, as Mabley's relocated to the former Rollman & Sons flagship across Fifth Street.  A Cincinnati tradition was born in July 1964 when a bridge across the second level of the arcade was constructed to connect the two Pogue spaces, with the Ice Cream Bridge featuring local favorite Graeter's Ice Creams.  "The Bridge" was an instant hit, with a version added to the Tri-County store opening directly into the shopping mall as Pogue’s Ice Cream Parlour. 

An enormous parking garage with space for 1,600 cars (it would remain Cincinnati's largest privately-owned garage until its demolition in 2017) was constructed across Race Street with a covered walkway into the store's second floor.  Each level of the garage was named after a flavor of ice cream available on the Ice Cream Bridge to help shoppers remember where they parked.  The street and second floors of the downtown store were redecorated in a contemporary French Provincial style by the famed architectural firm of Raymond Loewy Associates, highly respected for their futuristic Lord & Taylor stores in the New York, Connecticut, and Washington, D.C. suburbs.

A chic new restaurant, the Camargo Room, was added on the store's sixth floor in time for the 1964 Christmas Season, replacing the more traditional Rose Room on the third floor.  Similar to Lord & Taylor's Birdcage Restaurants, ads promoting the restaurant made it clear that the Camargo Room was a new, modern style of department store dining far removed from the traditional tea room, with a limited menu, faster service, and fixed prices.  It was also noted that cigarette smoking by women was welcome.  The room proved so popular that a Camargo Restaurant was added to the Tri-County store.

Kenwood Plaza would be expanded in 1965-66 to nearly 200,000 square feet with a second floor that allowed the addition of men's and children's departments, a Camargo Restaurant, home store, and beauty salon, all served by a new parking garage connecting shoppers to both levels of the store.  After their success with the downtown store, Raymond Loewy & Associates was selected for the work.  Kenwood Plaza would remain the largest and most successful Pogue's branch store through the chain's existence, and by 1983 was surpassing the downtown store in annual sales with a third the square footage.  

Efforts to update the Pogue image were apparent in 1970 when suburban expansion continued with a 153,000 square foot three-level store in Northgate Mall.  The palatial design of the Kenwood and Tri-County stores with their gleaming white brick, floodlit exteriors and generous landscaping was dropped in favor of a Modernist design with a striking exterior entranceway, glass elevator, and a more casual dining concept called The Balcony. 

In 1972, the components of Pogue's end-game would start to take shape when ADG purchased L.S. Ayres (13 stores) and Stewart Dry Goods (7 stores) based in nearby Indianapolis and Louisville, respectively.  Unlike the other ADG regional carriage trade chains, L.S. Ayres and Stewart's were the mid-market, dominant department stores in their marketplaces, more similar to Shillito's in Cincinnati. ADG now had a 25-store cluster of stores across the Indiana, Ohio, and Kentucky tristate, and cost synergies between the three, while operating independently, began to be implemented.  As one of the two smallest chains within ADG, Pogue's was often the test ground for new CEO's and a parade of young store leaders on two to three year rotations would become commonplace in the Executive Office, unsettling to staff who had worked for generations of Pogue family members.  Efforts to update the brand were evident in the 1972 holiday catalogue, which featured a caftan-clad woman strumming a guitar rather than Pogue's traditional Christmas-themed illustrated covers.

The creation of a series of second-level walkways, or skywalks in the local usage, in the early 1970s benefited the downtown Pogue's store more advantageously than its rivals.  To the west, the store was connected into the new Cincinnati Plaza Hotel, soon renamed the Westin Cincinnati, and Fifth/Third Center.  To the south across Fourth Street, a skywalk connected Pogue's second floor with that of competitor McAlpin's.  To the north across Fifth Street, a skywalk led to Mabley & Carew department store, a new convention center, the Terrace Hilton Hotel, the Skywalk Twin Cinemas, and a variety of restaurants.  An existing bridge to the west connected the store to its 11-story parking garage, with the result that Pogue's second floor became a crossroads for downtown workers and tourists with a cross-current of shoppers that, especially at lunchtime, revitalized the aging store.  Pogue's store planners carved out a series of shops along the skywalks, including Pogue's Fine Services (fur storage, dry cleaning, and shoe repair) on the garage skywalk, and Flowers by Pogue's on the Fifth Street skywalk.

An innovative, forwarding-looking redesign of the Downtown store saw the Fourth and Race Streets show windows removed and the sales floor made visible to the street to showcase Fourth Street Market with updated Housewares and Epicure departments, including a branch of the local Servatti's Bakery. Le Petit Cafe', an upscale food bar that featured a variety of pates, salads, and wines, would hold the same appeal for a new generation of fashionable Cincinnati shoppers that the Camargo Room had for their parents in a more genteel era.  Fourth Street Market gave the downtown store renewed vitality and a bustling lunchtime crowd that would, ironically, outlast Pogue's itself.

As shoppers continued to migrate to the suburbs, the 1970s also saw the closure of the downtown store's basement sales level, which became the new Merchandise Receiving facility.  Following an ADG corporate mandate to better reach younger customers, Juniors was moved to the Main Floor with its own Fourth Street entrance, and many departments were discontinued including Appliances, Books, Draperies, the Home Planning Center, Paints, Records, and Toys.  The Service Building was closed with the surviving workrooms incorporated into the newly-vacant downtown store space or outsourced.  The Camargo Room service was modified from a quick-service set menu to full service, with a self-service Soup & Salad Bar opened in the adjacent former Customer Lounge for those in a hurry.  Full menu service was also added to the Ice Cream Bridge, renamed the Bridge Restaurant.

The final Pogue's branch store would open in 1976, a modest 112,000 square foot location in Florence Mall, the chain's only venture into Kentucky and the only one without a furniture department or restaurant.  As ADG continued to attempt to update its Pogue's unit in the late 1970s, Tri-County's Ice Cream Parlor would be moved into the store and reformatted to the Le Petite Café format which had proven so successful in the Downtown store.

As the 1970s drew to a close, the Pogue's chain seemed destined for success with premier locations in the city's five top retail markets, most notably in a revitalized downtown Cincinnati.  But a harbinger of the difficult decade ahead was in 1978 when the Mabley & Carew stores, a rival of Pogue's dating to 1877, were purchased by Dayton-based Elder-Beerman and converted to their nameplate.  Twenty years later, a Cincinnati retail landscape that had lasted a century would have vanished.

Merger and Closure 
As the Ohio Valley suffered in the recession of the early 1980s, Pogue's profits declined. The downtown store, in particular, had seen immediate sales declines since 1983 when a city-subsidized Saks Fifth Avenue opened directly across Race Street.  Saks' demands that Pogue's reduce their Race Street loading docks dramatically hurt the viability of the downtown store which had served as the receiving and distribution center for all five stores.  A new standalone facility in northern Kentucky added to the expenses of the H.& S. Pogue Company division, and in 1983 Pogue's was merged into their Indianapolis ADG sister division L.S. Ayres & Company in a successful effort to keep both divisions profitable. ADG's annual report to its shareholders would note that the first full year of the merger saw sales increase 22%, and profits nearly 50%, at the five Cincinnati-area stores, with market share being moved from all three major competitors (by then Elder-Beerman, McAlpin’s, and ShillitoRikes). The merger had been anticipated by ADG senior management for several years, with the Pogue's and L.S. Ayres logos each being modified for consistency between both chains, and Pogue's merchandise assortment being down-scaled throughout the early 1980s to the more mid-market range of L.S. Ayres.

The corporate merger was accomplished with little fanfare and L.S. Ayres operated the former Pogue locations with minimal changes for an additional three years. The Fourth Street Market continued to be so popular in the former Pogue's locations that the concept was incorporated into larger L.S. Ayres stores and a private label line of wines and gourmet foods, "Fourth Street Market," developed.  Larger L.S. Ayres stores would also incorporate Pogue's successful Center for the Executive Woman, which had been noteworthy enough to earn the cover of an ADG annual report of the period.

With shopping habits changing and the age of the carriage trade department store slowly drawing to a close, ADG merged L.S. Ayres and Louisville's Stewart Dry Goods in 1985 in yet another effort to keep the regional chains profitable.  In October 1986, ADG was itself acquired for US$2.2 billion by May Department Stores in the largest retail merger in the United States to that date.  A few months later, long-time competitor John Shillito Company, by then trading as ShillitoRikes after a merger with its Dayton sister chain Rike Kuhmler Company, was merged into Columbus-based F. & R. Lazarus, and the iconic Shillito name also disappeared from Cincinnati's retail landscape.  The last local Cincinnati department store would vanish a decade later when McAlpin's would be purchased by Arkansas-based Dillard's along with its Mercantile Stores sister divisions. 

Within months of their purchase of ADG, May Department Stores exited the Cincinnati market.  The Kenwood Plaza, Tri-County Center, and Northgate Mall locations were sold to the J.C. Penney Company, the Florence Mall store to Hess Brothers, and the downtown store closed.  The Samuel Hannaford-designed building on Fourth Street was demolished to make way for Tower Place Mall, which would fail and close in 2012 to be converted to a parking garage for the Netherland Plaza Hotel.  The street level of the Carew Tower sections of the store was subdivided into various retail spaces and restaurants.  On February 1, 2021, the Cincinnati Enquirer reported that Duke Energy had served the owners of Carew Tower, by then bleeding tenant revenues, with a 10-day termination of service notice for lack of payment; by November foreclosure documents were filed on the landmark skyscraper. 

After several years as a J.C. Penney, Pogue's former showplace Kenwood Plaza store would be converted to a branch of upscale Alabama-based Parisian Stores in 1993. Parisian was purchased by North Carolina-based Belk, Inc. in 2007. Choosing not to enter the Cincinnati market, Belk sold the location to Nordstrom, which demolished the store for a new location that, as of 2022, is still operating. 

The Tri-County Center store was gutted with the first level converted into a new mall entrance, a BJ's Restaurant and Brewhouse, and an Ethan Allen furniture store, with the second level empty.  In February 2022, developers received preliminary approval from the local zoning agency to demolish much of the mall, including the former Pogue's store, to build a multi-use development with housing, office space, and educational facilities. In March, the closing date of the mall was announced as May 15. 

The Northgate Mall store was demolished in 2008 to make way for a cinema complex.  Ironically, only the smallest Pogue's location continues as a department store as of 2021: The Florence Mall location sold to Hess' in 1988 would, in 1993, become a Home Store site for the F.& R. Lazarus division of Federated Department Stores, with all Lazarus stores being rebranded as Macy's in 2005.  

As of 2022, the vacant Service Building is the sole remaining downtown remnant of the original four-building Pogue complex.  A proposal for its sale for redevelopment was announced in mid-August 2020 with an asking price of $5.1 million but, as of 2022, it remains vacant.

A Facebook page for fans and former employees of the H. & S. Pogue Company was started in 2010 as "H&S Pogue Company of Cincinnati."  As of 2022, the page numbers nearly 1100 fans including descendants of both Henry and Samuel Pogue.

References

American companies established in 1863
Retail companies established in 1863
Defunct department stores based in Cincinnati
1863 establishments in Ohio